Kurt Körner (13 May 1912 – 1945) was a German ski jumper. He competed in the individual event at the 1936 Winter Olympics. He was killed in action during World War II.

References

External links
 

1912 births
1945 deaths
German male ski jumpers
Olympic ski jumpers of Germany
Ski jumpers at the 1936 Winter Olympics
People from Klingenthal
German military personnel killed in World War II
Sportspeople from Saxony
20th-century German people